The Archdiocese of Bucharest (Romanian: Arhiepiscopia Bucureștilor) is an episcopal see of the Romanian Orthodox Church with jurisdiction over the counties of Ilfov and Prahova. The current head of the Archdiocese is Patriarch Daniel, as Archbishop of Bucharest, Metropolitan of Muntenia and Dobruja.

Bucharest